Guinea-Bissau (Mandinka:  Gine-Bisawo), officially the Republic of Guinea-Bissau, is a country in West Africa that covers  with an estimated population of 1,726,000. It borders Senegal to its north and Guinea to its southeast. Guinea-Bissau is the only Portuguese-speaking country in which Muslims make up the majority of its population.

Guinea-Bissau was once part of the kingdom of Kaabu, as well as part of the Mali Empire. Parts of this kingdom persisted until the 18th century, while a few others were under some rule by the Portuguese Empire since the 16th century. In the 19th century, it was colonised as Portuguese Guinea. Portuguese control was restricted and weak until the early 20th century with the pacification campaigns, these campaigns solidified Portuguese sovereignty in the area. The final Portuguese victory over the remaining bastion of mainland resistance, the Papel ruled Kingdom of Bissau in 1915 by the Portuguese military office Teixeira Pinto, and recruited Wolof mercenary Abdul Injai was the event to solidify mainland control. The Bissagos, islands off the coast of Guinea-Bissau, were officially conquered in 1936, ensuring Portuguese control of both the mainland and islands  of the region. Upon independence, declared in 1973 and recognised in 1974, the name of its capital, Bissau, was added to the country's name to prevent confusion with Guinea (formerly French Guinea). Guinea-Bissau has a history of political instability since independence, and only one elected president (José Mário Vaz) has successfully served a full five-year term. The current president is Umaro Sissoco Embaló, who was elected on 29 December 2019.

Only about 2% of the population speaks Portuguese, the official language, as a first language, and 33% speak it as a second language. However, Guinea-Bissau Creole, a Portuguese-based creole, is the national language and also considered the language of unity. According to a 2012 study, 54% of the population speak Creole as a first language and about 40% speak it as a second language. The remainder speak a variety of native African languages. The nation is home to numerous followers of Islam, Christianity and traditional faiths, though no single religious group represents a majority of the population. The country's per-capita gross domestic product is one of the lowest in the world.

Guinea-Bissau is a member of the United Nations, African Union, Economic Community of West African States, Organisation of Islamic Cooperation, Community of Portuguese Language Countries, Organisation internationale de la Francophonie, and the South Atlantic Peace and Cooperation Zone, and was a member of the now-defunct Latin Union.

History

Pre-European contact

People and society 
Archaeology has insufficiently explained the Guinea-Bissau pre-history. In 1000 AD, there were hunter-gatherers in the area, hundreds of thousands of years after they traversed the rest of Africa. This was shortly followed, in the archaeological record, by agriculturists using iron tools.

Guinea Bissau has always been connected to the interior, trade routes connected Guinea Bissau to the Sudanese states (p. 18). Megaliths discovered in Guinea Bissau sharing similarity with rock paintings in the Sahara detailed with horses and camels, and ancient gold workings (p. 19). 

The population originated from the interior, pushed coastal by the Sudanese states (p.19, 25). The oldest inhabitants of were the Jolas, Papels, Manjaks, Balantas, Biafadas, and Bijagos later on the Mandinka and Fulani migrated into the region (p. 20). The Mandinka migrated in mass around the 13th century, result of the invasion and incorporation of Senegambia into the Mali Empire by General Tiramakhan Troare, also responsible for the establishment of Kaabu as a province of Mali. A small number of Mandinka were present in the region as early as the 11th century with hunters, fishermen, and traders migrating into the Senegambia. Accepted by the locals and beginning a process of  'Mandinkization' (p. 6). The Fulani arrived as early as the 12th century as semi-nomadic herders, in the 15th century their population increased.

The Papels inhabited the Biombo region, Balanta the Oio region, Manjaks the Cacheu region, Mandinka overlap in north east Oio but are mainly in the Bafata region, Biafada the Quinara region, Bijagos the Bijagos, and Fulani in Gabu, though Mandinka and Fulani overlap with each other. (p. 23). The Manjaks and Papels are intelligible resulting in European sources labelling Manjaks as Buramos/Papels (p. 6). 

In terms of societal structures the Mandinka, Fula, Papel, Manjak, and Biafada possessed highly stratified structures.  The Balanta had no institution of kingship based on property, authority, or power with instead an emphasis on heads of villages and families present. The Jola possessed kings but no clear institutions of kingship, of which mirrored the Balanta with emphasis on heads of families (p. 64). Those with societal stratification followed the design of provinces with chiefs, and chiefs in allegiance to kings. The Biafada had three kingdoms with multiple chieftains under the king, and Papels in Bissau the same structure (p. 65). Kingship varied in terms of customs, rites, coronation, and ceremonies (pp. 66, 67). The Portuguese observed these societies holding courts with officials, such as 'mayors', 'governors', 'ambassadors', and 'generals' (p. 68). The society was divided into the hierarchy of kings, chiefs, nobles, and commoners (p. 73). Law of the land was the kings law and administration of the law was done through the king and his judges, judges all coming from the nobility (p. 227). Those of the nobility were the only ones with the ability to make claim to the throne, or other high positions of power in the kingdoms (pp. 74–76). Additionally, the stratification was seen in the clothing and accessories of the people with the poor wearing grass skirts, the better off animal skin usually from goatskin, kings and nobles shirts and trousers made of cotton. An iron ring with bells to give commands was worn by kings and nobles, a drum called bombalon used for communication was in the hands of the kings and nobles due to the financing of these specially trained bombalon players. Differences were seen in the houses with better construction material available for kings and nobles. The few horses there were owned by kings and nobles, while common people used castrated oxen for transportation (pp. 77, 78). Private property was instituted amongst the Mandinka, Fula, Papel, Manjaks, and Biafadas in Guinea Bissau. However, the Balanta were distinct in that the Balantas owned parcels of land, labour was through the use of reciprocation through the reward of land they worked on. The others contrasted the Balanta, as land development was in the hands of those who could afford the necessary labour, and land was not administered to labourers as a form of payment (p. 75).  

Inter-ethnic relations was mainly in trade, the Balantas possessed the best agricultural techniques, leading the Beafada and Papels to be reliant on Balanta produce. Balanta unwillingness to trade with Europeans meant goods reached Europeans through the Papel and Beafada and vice versa (p. 69). Items traded amongst the region were as such, Biafadas traded pepper and kola nuts from the southern forests, the Papel, Felupe, and Banhun traded kola nuts, iron, and iron utensils from the savannah-forest zone, coastal regions provided salt and dried fish, the Mandinka themselves produced cotton cloth (p. 4). The products were commonly sold on markets and fairs held weekly acting as both commercial and social functions, held usually in the lands of the Papel and Beafada open to the public on certain days of the week or every eight days (p. 69). Markets typically opened up on the morning of the day, and finished in the evening to be repeated the week after, weapons were prohibited in the market place and soldiers were positioned around the area to keep order throughout the day (p. 70). Markets and fairs could be attended by up to several thousand buyers and sellers from as far as 60 miles away, the organisation went as such, sections of the market would be allocated for specific products except for wine which could be sold anywhere, the exception for wine vendors highlighted the markets social function (p.70). 

A culture of naval navigation was integral due the river systems of Guinea Bissau, canoes were routinely used to navigate riverways. The canoes importance were highlighted in a local proverb used in the region: "the blood of kings and the tears of the canoe-maker are sacred things which must not touch the ground" (pp. 42–44). Canoes varied in size with the smallest fit for one man, to those that could carry 60 men, in the region only Bijago canoes were deemed sea-worthy (pp. 42, 43). The Jolas used one man canoes to travel their flooded rice fields, and the Bijagos preferred large canoes to carry their troops to the mainland in coastal raids (p. 42). The construction of canoes varied in the region, in the forest regions canoes tended to be imported from other ethnical groups who had specialties in its construction, the Jola would employ Mandinka boatbuilders for theirs (p. 43).Description of the canoes used in this region was made by British explorer John Hawkins: 

"Fashioned from a single trunk the final proportions were 24 x 3 feet, with a prow in the form of a beak, a proportionately raised stem, and an exterior artistically carved and painted blue. Each held about twenty to thirty men, but the active crew comprised a helmsman and four rowers, using very long oars with relatively small blades," (p. 42). 

The construction and design of these canoes was diverse, the Bijagos being the best canoes were described as: 

"hewn from the giant silk cotton tree, and measuring about seventy feet in length. A number of boards, called falsas by the Portuguese, were added to the sides, and, thus modified, each almadia (Canoe) carried twenty-four men and their weapons, and had room for prisoners and cattle when returning from their expeditions on the mainland." (p. 42). 

The technique of rowing employed by the Bijagos was described as:  

"It was also propelled in a different manner from the canoes lower down the coast in Sierra Leone, according to a nineteenth century reference. All the individuals on board were rowers, who squatted at the bottom of the boat, and rose at the beginning of each stroke of their short oars," (p. 43).

Kingdom of Bissau (1300–1915)

Origins 
The Kingdom of Bissau was started by the son of the King of Quinara, who began the kingdom when he moved to Bissau with his pregnant sister, six wives, and subjects from his father's kingdom. The seven clans of the kingdom are said to have come from the sister and six wives of Mecau, these being the Bottat, Bossuzu, Boiga, Bosafinte, Bodjukumo, Bosso, and Bossassun, the latter of whom descends from the sister of Mecau. Characteristic of the region, the Bossassun inherited the throne, and were the nobility alongside the Bodjukumo. The Kingdom of Bissau had multiple vassal states such as Prabis, Antula, Safim, Quisset, Tor, and Biombo.

Society 
The Kingdom of Bissau was highly stratified with the top of society being the king, nobles, and then commoners and was strictly enforced (pp. 73–79).The King of Bissau would go through their coronation, receive their badge of office for this kingdom was a spear, other Papel Kingdoms used the bow (p. 66). The coronation involved the practice of binding and beating the king, as the king should know what punishment felt like before administering it (p. 66). Nobles would be assigned to principalities as governors subject to the King of Bissau and part of his court (p. 364). Houses in the kingdom were made of clay, and roofs of leaves from the surrounding trees, and the inhabitants were pagans until the Jesuits arrival (p. 366).  

Papels suffered slave raids from the Bijagos who would stage maritime expeditions into Bissau for slaves (p. 204). However, Papels themselves were slave traders, staging slave raids against the Balantas, Biafadas, and Bijagos with the assistance from the Europeans and Lançados (p. 207).

Decline 
Centuries of warfare between the Kingdom of Bissau and Portuguese Empire of which the kingdom strongly defended its sovereignty, defeating the Portuguese in the years of 1891, 1894, and 1904 during the Pacification Campaigns (p. 9). However, in 1915 and after 30 years of the Portuguese campaigns, the Portuguese defeated the Kingdom of Bissau under the command of Officer Teixeira Pinto, and Warlord Abdul Injai, and, for the first time in the kingdom's existence, Bissau lost its independence.

Beafada Kingdoms

Kingdom of Guinala 
The King of Guinala was a grandiose figure, attended too by a retinue of archers, alongside 50 guard dogs dressed in tough Sea-Cow skin  (p. 365). These dogs were formed in response to slave raiders breaking into homes, and kidnapping them (p. 365).

Under the king there were seven governors who wore hats given to them as a sign of their station (p. 365). The kingdom extended jurisdiction over six kingdoms, the governors of these kingdoms were gathered in the form of a council.  Under the king would be the main governor who was described as a President (p. 365). 

Their religion was idol worship. The idols in the region were called 'Xina', though some converted to Roman Catholicism in the early period of European contact (p. 366).

Royal funerals went as such, twelve men in long coats made of feathers, following a band of pipers playing mournful music, declared the king's death to the masses on the streets (p. 366). White clothes would be worn them for the day, nothing being done except walking the streets in mourning. The late king's friends, relatives, and servants would  congregate to appoint a successor (p. 366). The king's body would be washed, his entrails burnt before an idol, the ashes of his entrails preserved and put with the body of which would lie in state for a month, then all the subjects of the kingdoms would bring balsam, myrrh, ambergris, musk, and other perfumes to burn and be smoked around the corps (p. 366). Six eminent people would carry the body to be buried while clothed in white silk, behind a band of musicians followed with mournful music, who in turn are followed by many people singing mournfully or crying aloud, the prince followed on horseback while dressed in white (p. 366). Near the grave waited his women, servants, horses, and favourite people to be put to death and buried alongside him, to serve in the afterlife, their death would be by their toes and fingers being severed, and bones crushed by stamping. Servants would try leave the services of the king prior to his death, or hide when they realised he would not recover (p. 366).

Kingdom of Biguba 
The people of the kingdom lived the same way as those from the Kingdom of Guinala. Observers to this kingdom said once a king died, the crown fell went to the strongest family, this would and did lead to armed conflict, battles lasted until the strongest contestant reduced his opponent to obedience (p. 367). 

They followed the same religion as those from the Kingdom of Guinala (p. 367). 

The Kingdom of Biguba had less chiefs underneath them than the Kingdom of Guinala, holding administration over four kingdoms with four governors (p. 65).

A sizeable population of Afro-Portuguese citizens lived in the kingdom, these Afro-Portuguese swore allegiance to the natives, and they would follow local religions, dress like the locals, and undergo scarification (p. 366).

Island States of the Bijagos

Origins 
The Bijagos are from the region the Biafada are currently in, leaving their original home for the Islands, the population that migrated were not homogenous with Islands having differing affinities to different mainland ethnicities (p. 25). Each Island was governed by lords whom swore allegiance to the King of Isla do Po (p. 364). All the Islands were inhabited except for the Island of Bolama which was inhabited by the Biafadas, however, control of the Island has traded hands multiple times (p. 7) (p. 5).

Society 
Described as large in stature, and reputed for their courage and hardy disposition, they were renowned for their skills in boat craft, sailing, harassing the waters of the region, and regular staging of raids on the mainland. The Bijagos would attack European ships that crossed their waters, and those who tried to take their land (p. 364).  The Bijago canoes were unique in that they were sea worthy, meaning after their coastal raids regions they did not have to fear retaliation. 

Bijago society was warlike. Women cultivated land, constructed houses, and gathered food (p. 204). Men were dedicated to boat crafting and warring the mainland, attacking the coastal people like the Jolas, Papels, and Balantas, and believing on the sea they had no king, also attacking other Islands (p. 204). These soldiers were reputed to be excellent swimmers, sailors, and soldiers, in this society women chose their husbands, only choosing warriors with the biggest reputation. Successful warriors could have many wives and boats, the owner of these boats were entitled to 1/3 of the spoils of any expedition (p. 205).  

Coastal raids went as such, warriors anointing their body in red ochre, coal and white clay, placed feathers in their hair, and hung horse tails from their breasts with little bells. A priestess would break an egg over the stern of the boat, setting off to arrive on the coast at night (p. 205). With rapid speed they would arrive on the coast, surroun coastal villages, set fire to the homes, and if met with resisted would be cut down though occupants usually surrendered (p. 205). So efficient were these raids that Portuguese traders tried to get the Portuguese authorities to stop them, as they were decimating the Biafadas, however, so successful were these raids, the Portuguese were getting a high surplus of slaves, and Lemos Coelho a Cape Verdean trader described how in 25 trips over a couple of years over a 1,000 slaves were captured by the raids (p. 206). In the early 17th century with the monetary gains made from the raids, the Bijago Islands joined together in their war with the mainland, increasing the size of their fleets and soldiers (p. 206). These raids resulted in the King of Guinala losing six kingdoms, and the king fleeing into the forest (p. 364). The Portuguese influence on the Bijago was by appealing to their honour, if slaves were few in number in the ports they would call it a stain on their good name, and other Europeans would ignore their ports as a result. These appeals to their pride would be enough to increase their raiding intensity (p. 207).  

The Bijagos were the most safe from enslavement, their lsland kept them out of the hands of the mainland slave raiders (p. 218). Europeans did not find them fit for slavery and avoided having them as slaves. Portuguese sources say the children made good slaves but not the adults, whom were likely too commit suicide as they believed their spirits returned back to the Bijagos, known for slave rebellions on ships, and in the New World for their tendency to escape (pp. 218, 219).

Kaabu Province of Imperial Mali (1200–1537) – Kaabu Empire (1537–1865)

Origins 
Kaabu was established as a province of Mali through the conquest of the Senegambia by the one of the generals of Sundiata Keita called Tiramakhan Troare. According to oral tradition Tiramakhan went to the region in retaliation for an insult given to Sundiata by the Wolof King, resulting in the conquest of the Wolof's, and then carried down past the River Gambia into the Casamance. This initiated a migration of Mandinka into the region in the 13th century, though a small population of Mandinka already lived there. The 14th century a lot of Guinea Bissau was under Mali administration and ruled by a Farim Kaabu (Commander of Kaabu).

The decline of the Mali Empire in the 14th century lead to Kaabu becoming independent in the 16th century. The right to rule came from their history as an imperial province, Farim Kaabu was replaced with Kaabu Mansaba. The capital of the empire was Kansala, modern day Gabu, eastern Guinea Bissau in the Geba region (p. 4). All the region excluding the Papels, Manjaks, and western Biafadas obeyed and paid dues to the Mansaba (p. 367).

Society 
The empire ran more militaristic with stricter social stratifications than the Mali Empire. The ruling classes were composed of elite warriors from the Nyancho ( Ñaanco) tracing their patrilineal lineage to Tiramakhan Troare, and matrilineal to a mysterious native called Baleba who was believed to possess supernatural powers (p. 3). The Mansaba was established matrilineally through the sister of the Mansaba, whose son would be next in line (p. 3).  

The Nyancho were immersed in a warrior culture, and were reputed to be excellent cavalry men and warring raiders, slaves farmed and maintained their mounts, for the Nyancho the highest honour was to achieve Mansaba (p. 6). Young men would travel solely for the goal of marauding and war. Europeans reported these were expert horsemen to the point other kingdoms requested them, and they typically filled the high military ranks of other forces (p. 369). 

The society was militaristic focused on control of the slave trade in the region. The warrior clans became rich trading with the Europeans (p. 6). In efforts to stave off northern military incursions from the Serer and Wolof states, and control trade they incorporated surrounding states, giving better protect to themselves and securing economic gain from the trade markets (p. 7).Trade would bring the noble spirits, imported cloth, beads, metal ware, and firearms as commodities that enhanced their prestige, and a surplus of foodstuffs providing security and securing political alliances (p. 8). The life maintained by the elites had to of course be sustained, this is where commoners and slaves became useful, the latter maintained horses and did the agricultural work, commoners were the farmers, artisans created farm equipment and tools for horse riding, and the marabouts and non-Islamic priests dealt in magic and divination (p. 8). In summary the Empires organisation was that the central government was in Kansala, the Kaabu Mansaba was the emperor with Farim Mansa's as governors of each province, provinces provided soldiers and were further divided into administrative units, who were governed over by aristocratic families (p. 5).

The empires was Mandinka, the lingua franca was Mandinka, the social institutions was Mandinka, the political institutions was Mandinka, and the historical traditions was Mandinka, the empire prided itself on its Imperial Mandinka history (p. 11). 'Mandinkization' was big in the empire, individuals from other ethnic background became Mandinka culturally, and the frequent inter-ethnic marriages between the Mandinka and other ethnicities assisted the process, Europeans and Afro-Europeans living in the region could and would become 'Mandinkized' to a certain extent, due to these loose ethnical boundaries it became that kinship was more important than ethnicity (p. 12). Kinship was important at the highest echelons of society. The elite were likely to identify with each other regardless of ethnic backgrounds, Soninke who practiced Soninkeya was their identification, Soninke referred to animists in the region, this term bound together these elites regardless of origins or location (p. 12). Their religion was the worship of stocks and stones and regularly communication with divinatory, the high priest had residence in the main capital of the empire (p. 368). Kaabu was the most powerful Western Mandinka state at the time after Mali fell (p. 13). 

Commoners lived through the employment of their skills, such as growing crops, rearing livestock, becoming traders for the nobles, or marabouts making magical charms for elite warriors (p. 15). Those with no way of employing their skills were in a dangerous situation, and servitude was likely to their end under Europeans, North Africans, or far off African courts (p. 15).   

Moreover, the Kaabu integrated more closely the trade networks of Guinea Bissau to North Africa in the 14th century, and the Europeans in the 15th century (p. 3). The trade that Kaabu tapped into in Guinea Bissau was economically enrichening (p. 4). Slaves were a large source of income, reports estimated in the years between the 1600s and 1700s, 700 slaves annually left the region, so 70,000 slaves in a 100 years were exported, which Kaabu would have had a big hand in supplying (p. 5) The Arabians (North Africans) and surrounding merchants were noted for trading specifically in the region for gold, which the country was said to have much of (p. 367).

Decline 
After 800 years of existence and 47 Mansa's the Empire began to decline for multiple reasons including civil war. In the 18th and 19th centuries Muslim states surrounded this pagan state, resulting in the Imamate of Futa Jallon declaring Jihad on them, with assistance from Muslim Soninke and Mandinka chiefs. Futa Jallon gained support from the local Fula's who wanted independence from Kaabu (pp. 5, 6).  The two states warred for a number of years with Kaabu repelling the Imamate for a long period, stopping the Imamate at the fort of Berekolong until the 1860s, where they were defeated at Berekolong. This war lead to a final confrontation between the Imamate and Kaabu in 1867 called the Battle of Kansala, an army led by General Alfa Molo Balde laid siege to the earthen walls of Kansala for 11 days. The Fulani forces consisted of 35,000 ground troops and 12,000 cavalry. Oral traditions say a Timbo marabout told the Fulani forces that if they fired the first shot they would lose, and a Jakhanke told the Nyancho if they fired the first shot they would lose. The siege was in a stalemate until a Nyancho angered at the presence of Fula troops outside their walls, seeing it cowardly not to attack shot first, the Mandinka kept the Fulani from climbing the walls for a time, but the walls were overwhelmed. The Mansaba Dianke Walli seeing that he would lose, gave the Imamate a pyrrhic victory, ordering his troops to set the cities gunpowder on fire, killing the Mandinka defenders alongside the Imamate ones. The loss of Kansala marked the end of the Kaabu, alongside Mandinka dominance in the region with their incorporation into the Imamate of Futa Jallon (p. 3). Smaller Mandinka states did continue to exist in the region until their incorporation into the Portuguese Empire (p. 7).

European contact

15th–16th centuries 
Guinea-Bissau was made known to Europeans by the mid-1400s by mainly Portuguese explorers: Venetian explorer Alvise Cadamosto in 1455, Portuguese explorer Diogo Gomes in 1456, Portuguese explorer Duarte Pacheco Pareira in the 1480s, and Flemish explorer Eustache de la Fosse in 1479–1480 (pp. 7, 12, 13, 16). Additionally, the region was mentioned in secondary sources like the writings of Gomes Eanes de Zurara in the 1450s, Valentim Fernandes in the early 1500s, and German scholar Jerome Münzer  in the early 1500s. (pp. 4, 9, 15). 

The region from at least 1550 was known to the Portuguese as 'The Guinea of Cape Verde', Santiago was the administrative capital of the region (p. 138). Additionally, most of the settlers in Guinea-Bissau at the time were whites of Cape Verdean origin (p. 139). Trade between European and African agents began as early as the 1440s (p. 151). 

White settlements on the mainland was discouraged by Portuguese authorities, in contrast to the offshore Islands where settlements were encouraged. This discouragement was ignored by the Lançados (p. 140). Tangomão were white trader who assimilated into indigenous culture and customs, also used to describe white traders native auxiliaries (p. 141). Allied to the Lançados were the 'Grumete' made up of different natives in the region, these were at first slaves of sailors but later began to apply to free native assistants. Assistants varied on the rationale for their placement, some were slaves, others employed, and some relatives to the European trader. Grumetes remained an important part of the Lançados community (p. 151). Lançados were mainly from impoverished backgrounds, most traders were from Cape Verde and were people exiled from Portugal, traders were also of Jewish and New Christians backgrounds a result of anti-Semitism in the Iberian peninsula (pp. 148, 150). Lançados were targeted by Portuguese authorities as they ignored rules and regulations, rules such as the illegality of entering the region without a royal licence, trading goods without being a licensed trader, ships only porting at authorised ports, captains were responsible for their crews, and people regardless of rank could not assimilate into the native community (p. 142). In the 1500s Portugal took steps to reduce the Lançado problem in the region, aiming legislations at Cape Verde as the Islands acted like recruitment centres. Rules were made to reduce the chances of recruitment or the carrying out of illegal trade. The legislations were ineffective and did not reduce illegal trading with the mainland (p. 144). In 1520 measures against the Lançados reduced, trade and settlements increased on the mainland (p. 145). Reasons for reduced measures were religious and commercial, and in the latter half of the 1500s no hostile legislation passed against the Lançados (pp. 145, 146). The settlement population increased on the mainland and it was normal for Europeans to be living side by side with the natives. These Europeans were mainly Portuguese but there were also Spanish, Genoese, English, French, and Dutch settlers in the region (p. 150). 

The Lançados were focused on slavery and as intermediaries between European vessels and African producers, the regions rivers possessed no natural harbours, leaving the Lançados to navigate riverways and creeks in small boats, to take native products back to European vessels on the few ports available, being Cacheu, Bissau, and Guinala. The waterways being the main mode of transport, small boats were used by both the Lançados and native to navigate these rivers. Lançados bought boats from European vessels, or in most circumstances built them themselves through specially trained grumetes. At different estuaries trading depots were established some linked to Cape Verde, and others serving as clearing houses for the trading centres of Cacheu, Guinala, and Bissau. The furthest point of the rivers held trading centres connected to the produce of the interior (pp. 153–157). Settlements were established in relation to these trading centres, convenient villages and locations were chosen for settlement. Villages that had a Lançado population attracted other Africans. Movement in the areas of Bissau, Cacheu, Guinala, and local trading centres were one type of migration because of Portuguese activity, the other was groups from the interior migrating closer to the coast in small numbers, Interior expeditions by the Portuguese were more common than migration. The Mande from the interior offered resources like gums, ivory, hides, civet, dyes, slaves, and gold of which Lançados traversed into the interior for, transporting it back to the coast to be made available to the international community (pp. 158–160). Trade was not limited to the Atlantic as Lançados helped establish trade between different regions of the Upper Guinea, trade was opened from the Gambia through Guinea-Bissau to the Cape Mount region (pp. 162, 163).

Europeans were not accepted in all communities, the Jolas, Balantas, and at first the Bijagos were hostile, in the 1500s a common sarcastic saying used by the Papels was:

"If you do not like it here, then perhaps the Balantas or the Bijagos would be more to your liking."

The other ethnicities of the region interacted with Europeans friendlier, all the groups harboured communities of Lançados. Lançados primarily interacted with the higher echelons of the regions society, any European trader on the land of a native king would be subject to taxation (p. 164, 165). Moreover, Lançados were subject to the laws and customs of the community they lived in, he was also subject to the local courts. The Lançados would use these local customs to their advantage, pushing to swear oaths and secure deals in the native way to have 100% guarantee (pp. 172, 173). Latter half of the 1500s the Lançados and their agreement to follow local customs came into question, their attempts to change certain customs and rules caused disagreements, such as in 1580 when they abandoned the settlement of Buguendo near Cacheu, once again in 1583 their settlement in Guinala, and Cacheu where they felt the customs were causing them harm and decided to create fortified settlements of their own along the coast. The forts construction was granted by the King Chapala of Cacheu in 1589 (pp. 175–177). 

These changes led to Papels, Manjaks, and Biafadas becoming hostile towards the Portuguese, other reasons for the declining relations was that the natives became fluent in Kriol, and becoming familiar with Lançados for some reason became contemptuous of them (p. 177, 178). In 1591 the first significant hostility between the Portuguese and mainland natives occurred, the Manjaks of Cacheu invaded the Fort of Cacheu which was a failure, the conflict ended in a peace agreement. This violent reaction contrasted the Biafadas reaction to the Portuguese actions in 1583, the Biafadas began to charge more for slaves and resources (pp. 179, 180). These responses by the native resulted in Lançados withdrawing into their own forts, to defend from any future attacks, and find exemption from native rules and customs. A lack of manpower meant garrisoning the forts of Cacheu and Guinala was difficult, and so they were still subject to the local rules and customs. Kicking the Lançados out was out of the question, as goods that the Lançados brought in were in demand with the upper class natives (pp. 180–184). 

The Portuguese were still dealing with the Lançados, whom not hunted like in the early 1500s, still defied authorities in the region causing difficulties with the Portuguese receiving their revenues from the trade, and governing Cape Verde and Guinea Bissau (p. 242). In 1580 because of the Iberian Union possessions in Guinea Bissau and Cape Verde were attacked by the enemies of Spain. The French, Dutch, and English ships made Portuguese monopoly difficult, and trade increased between other Europeans and the natives. The Lançados would facilitate trade with the English, French, and Dutch in the late 1500s especially at Cacheu, and Cacheu was the centre of Portuguese trade in the region (pp. 244–253).

17th–18th centuries 
In the 1500s, Upper Guinea was split into two districts: the 'Sierra Leone' and 'Rivers of Guinea' with the region of Guinea Bissau falling into the latter. In 1637, the contract of Cape Verde-Guinea was tied to three clauses that gives insight into the regional administration, from Santiago at least 12 ships in a four year period must be sent to the coast, prohibitions on certain items being sold to the natives (Primarily weapons), and guaranteeing settlers free trade on the mainland, along with enough slaves being imported for their own use (pp. 243, 244). Santiago's importance in the 1600s was reflected in the custom of all ships heading to and from the mainland, stopping and paying duties at Santiago. Santiago stopped ships from Spain and the Canaries going to the mainland, and heading to the Spanish Indies and not paying duties, in 1608 and 1615 Cape Verdeans petitioned to further enforce the Santiago rule that was being ignored, Portugal in 1619 reaffirmed the earlier decree of that ships must go through Santiago but was ineffective.  After 1640 the Portuguese fought European encroachment in the region of Cape Verde-Guinea Bissau, in the form of commercial attacks in Cacheu. Portugal had to re-establish monopoly in the region, that had been weakened during the Iberian Union (pp. 254–261).

Collapse of the Iberian Union (1640) 
The main centres of Portuguese activity after the Iberian Unions collapse in 1640 was Bissau and Cacheu (p. 260). An independent Portugal tried to counter Spain's influence, King João IV decreed Cape Verde-Guinea Bissau could not trade with Spain, Spanish vessels had to go through the Portuguese authorities, and Spanish ships were embargoed in the ports. These impositions on Spanish vessels were precursors to Portuguese conflicts with the natives and Lançados. From 1580 to 1640, the Spanish were key traders in the region, so Portuguese legislation against Spain affected the natives and pro-Spanish Lançados (pp. 261, 262).

In 1641, settlers in Bissau, Guinala, Geba, and Cacheu swore allegiance to the Portuguese King and aired grievances stemming from Spanish refusal to trade because of the embargo, further grieved by the 1639 to 1641 famines caused by locust attacks. Spanish trade resumed in 1641, welcomed by the Lançados and Manjak chiefs at Cacheu. The Manjaks who controlled the Cacheu port, viewed European merchandise as necessities, the Spanish not trading caused the Manjaks to threaten the white settlers of Cacheu with death if Captain-Major Luis de Magalhães  did not allow free trade (p. 263). The settlement at Cacheu was not allowed a water supply leaving the supply of water in Manjak hands, if cut off then trouble would ensue, additionally the famine of 1639–1641 wiped out the slave population in charge of defending the settlement, these and the fact Manjaks surrounded the ports once a ship was spotted to facilitate free trade, pushed Captain-Major Luis de Magalhães to life the embargo and allow free trade against the wishes of the authorities. Free trade in the region between the Spanish, Bissau, Geba, and Cacheu continued regardless of the Portuguese ban, through the facilitation of the Lançados and Manjak, Papel, and Biafada chiefs (pp. 263–265).

The position of Captain-Major was decided by the Conselho Ultramarino, and in 1641 Luis de Magalhães stepped down and was replaced with Gonçalo de Gamboa de Ayala, and Paulo Barradas da Silva was made treasurer. The Portuguese goal was to turn the fort of Cacheu to a fortress of stone, for better protection against European and the natives. Ayala won over the local King of Mata, Chief of Mompatas, Chief of Baorilla, and stopped Spanish ships at Cacheu. The peaceful approach taken was questioned after negotiations with the King Equendé of Bissau, two Spanish ships entered Bissau and were afforded full protection, Ayala for the first time pushed for violent repercussions against the King of Bissau though nothing came of it. Another problem was getting the Lançados under control, he was successfully through resettling the settlers of the infamous settlement of Geba, to the settlement of Farim north of Cacheu taking back control of the rivers estuary, and counter illegal commerce in the region (pp. 266–271). Successful as these attempts were at  monopolising control in the region, the British, French, and Dutch were still making profits off the Portuguese and native traders (p. 277). Free trade was difficult for the Portuguese to deal with, as the economic interests of the native leaders and Lançados never fully aligned with the Portuguese.

Slave trade 
The slave trade in the region was not as prominent as it was in other regions; however, Guinea-Bissau was a significant region in the Trans-Atlantic slave trade (p. 186). Slaves at the start were mainly sent to Cape Verde and the Iberian Peninsula, moreover, the Madeira and Canary Islands saw an influx of Bissau Guinean slaves at lower volumes (p. 187). From 1580 to 1640 slaves from Guinea-Bissau were destined for the Spanish Indies (p. 278). There were five main ways slaves were made, as punishment for law breaking, selling themselves or relatives during famines, kidnapped by native marauders or European raiders, previously a slave sold to Europeans by a previous master, or as prisoners of war (pp. 198, 199, 210, 211, 216). Europeans rarely risked slave raiding, the selling of themselves into slavery was most rare, and commonly slaves were bought by Europeans from local rulers or traders (pp. 199, 200).  

The diverse number of ethnicities made the slave trade common in the region, wars produced prisoners that could be sold off, however, most wars were waged for the sole purpose of capturing slaves (p. 204). The Bijagos mirrored the latter reason, staging coastal raids to capture slaves, the victims of the Bijagos were the Biafadas, Papels, Jolas, and Balantas (p. 204). The Papels slave raided the Balantas, Biafadas, and Bijagos with the direct assistance of the Lançados (p. 209). The Mandinka had great political and military power in the region, in the form of Kaabu Empire, slave raided the coastal groups (pp. 219–221). The Biafadas were singled out for the amount of criminals sold to Europeans, neighbouring groups accused them of introducing slavery (p. 217).  The Balantas and Jolas did not slave raid and were hostile towards it (p. 208, 217). In the Jolas case Mandinka slave raiders from Gambia travelled sailed south capturing them, later on Jolas would become prepared for this and in turn captured Mandinkas (p. 208). The Bijagos were too far from the mainland, coupled with their ferocious nature, proclivity to commit suicide, stage rebellions on ships, and tendency to escape plantations meant the Europeans did not favour them as slaves unless as children (p. 218). The inter-ethnic wars were noted to never be about territorial gain or political dominance, and only rarely happened because of any real animosity (p. 208). The incentive of European goods fuelled these wars, that European observers from the time deemed little more than robberies and man-hunts (p. 209). Slave raiding in this way started to take the form of a profession, individuals would wholly dedicate themselves to the act of capturing slaves for profit, the heir of the throne of the Kingdom of Bissau in the 1600s was himself a professional slave raider (p. 210). 

The slave trade and class divisions were intertwined in the region, victims of the slave trade were mostly of the lower class, the laws that could get individuals enslaved were created and implemented by nobles and king, this was summarised by Mateo de Anguiano:

"the rich and powerful enjoy the privilege of making captives, because there is nobody to resist them. They (the nobles) look upon so many persons with dislike, and when they feel so inclined, they easily exercise their privilege, because their own interests are not harmed by their greed. The king proceeds with the same licence." (p. 228).

If captured nobles were likely to be released, as the captors would be paid a ransom for them, even the Bijagos were willing to offer back captured nobles for a price, and this practice continued until the end of the 18th century, where captured nobles would be released on payment of a ransom (p. 229). This practice of nobles escaping slavery even carried over to the Europeans, when nobles were captured they were usually released once their nobility was discovered (p. 230). The relationship between kings and European traders was one of partnership and cooperation, with the two regularly making deals on how the trade was to be conducted, who was to be enslaved and who was not, and the prices of the slaves (pp. 230, 233, 234). It was noted by Fernão Guerreiro and Mateo de Anguiano when they questioned multiple kings on their part in the slave trade, they recognised the trade as evil but reasoned that they did it because the Europeans would buy no other goods from them (p. 234). The trade would carry on until the 19th century when it was abolished.

Summary  
Guinea-Bissau was once part of the kingdom of Kaabu, part of the Mali Empire in the 16th century. Parts of this kingdom persisted until the 18th century. Other parts of the territory in the current country were considered by the Portuguese as part of their empire. Portuguese Guinea was known as the Slave Coast, as it was a major area for the exportation of African slaves by Europeans to the western hemisphere.

Early reports of Europeans reaching this area include those of the Venetian Alvise Cadamosto's voyage of 1455, the 1479–1480 voyage by Flemish-French trader Eustache de la Fosse, and Diogo Cão. In the 1480s this Portuguese explorer reached the Congo River and the lands of Bakongo, setting up the foundations of modern Angola, some 4200 km down the African coast from Guinea-Bissau.

Although the rivers and coast of this area were among the first places colonized by the Portuguese, who set up trading posts in the 16th century, they did not explore the interior until the 19th century. The local African rulers in Guinea, some of whom prospered greatly from the slave trade, controlled the inland trade and did not allow the Europeans into the interior. They kept them in the fortified coastal settlements where the trading took place. African communities that fought back against slave traders also distrusted European adventurers and would-be settlers. The Portuguese in Guinea were largely restricted to the ports of Bissau and Cacheu. A small number of European settlers established isolated farms along Bissau's inland rivers.

For a brief period in the 1790s, the British tried to establish a rival foothold on an offshore island, at Bolama. But by the 19th century the Portuguese were sufficiently secure in Bissau to regard the neighbouring coastline as their own special territory.

An armed rebellion, begun in 1956 by the African Party for the Independence of Guinea and Cape Verde (PAIGC) under the leadership of Amílcar Cabral gradually consolidated its hold on the then Portuguese Guinea. Unlike guerrilla movements in other Portuguese colonies, the PAIGC rapidly extended its military control over large portions of the territory, aided by the jungle-like terrain, its easily reached borderlines with neighbouring allies, and large quantities of arms from Cuba, China, the Soviet Union, and left-leaning African countries. Cuba also agreed to supply artillery experts, doctors, and technicians. The PAIGC even managed to acquire a significant anti-aircraft capability in order to defend itself against aerial attack. By 1973, the PAIGC was in control of many parts of Guinea, although the movement suffered a setback in January 1973 when Cabral was assassinated.

Independence (1973)

Independence was unilaterally declared on 24 September 1973, which is now celebrated as the country's Independence Day, a public holiday. Recognition became universal following 25 April 1974 socialist-inspired military coup in Portugal, which overthrew Lisbon's Estado Novo regime. Nicolae Ceaușescu's Romania was the first country to formally recognise Guinea-Bissau and the first to sign agreements with the African Party for the Independence of Guinea and Cape Verde.

That same time upon independence, Esta É a Nossa Pátria Bem Amada, the national anthem of Guinea-Bissau, was shared alongside Cape Verde, which later adopted its own official national anthem Cântico da Liberdade in 1996, separating it.

Luís Cabral, brother of Amílcar and co-founder of PAIGC, was appointed the first president of Guinea-Bissau. Independence had begun under the best of auspices. The Bissau-Guinean diaspora had returned to the country en masse. A system of access to school for all had been created. Books were free and schools seemed to have a sufficient number of teachers. The education of girls, previously neglected, was encouraged and a new school calendar, more adapted to the rural world, was adopted. In 1980, economic conditions deteriorated significantly, leading to general discontent with the government in power. On 14 November 1980, João Bernardo Vieira, known as "Nino Vieira," overthrew President Luís Cabral. The constitution was suspended and a nine-member military council of the revolution, chaired by Vieira, was established. Since then, the country has moved toward a liberal economy. Budget cuts have been made at the expense of the social sector and education.

The country was controlled by a revolutionary council until 1984. The first multi-party elections were held in 1994. An army uprising in May 1998 led to the Guinea-Bissau Civil War and the president's ousting in June 1999. Elections were held again in 2000, and Kumba Ialá was elected president.

In September 2003, a military coup was conducted. The military arrested Ialá on the charge of being "unable to solve the problems". After being delayed several times, legislative elections were held in March 2004. A mutiny in October 2004 over pay arrears resulted in the death of the head of the armed forces.

From Vieira years to present
In June 2005, presidential elections were held for the first time since the coup that deposed Ialá. Ialá returned as the candidate for the PRS, claiming to be the legitimate president of the country, but the election was won by former president João Bernardo Vieira, deposed in the 1999 coup. Vieira beat Malam Bacai Sanhá in a run-off election. Sanhá initially refused to concede, claiming that tampering and electoral fraud occurred in two constituencies including the capital, Bissau.

Despite reports of arms entering the country prior to the election and some "disturbances during campaigning", including attacks on government offices by unidentified gunmen, foreign election monitors described the 2005 election overall as "calm and organized".

Three years later, PAIGC won a strong parliamentary majority, with 67 of 100 seats, in the parliamentary election held in November 2008. In November 2008, President Vieira's official residence was attacked by members of the armed forces, killing a guard but leaving the president unharmed.

On 2 March 2009, however, Vieira was assassinated by what preliminary reports indicated to be a group of soldiers avenging the death of the head of joint chiefs of staff, General Batista Tagme Na Wai, who had been killed in an explosion the day before. Vieira's death did not trigger widespread violence, but there were signs of turmoil in the country, according to the advocacy group Swisspeace. Military leaders in the country pledged to respect the constitutional order of succession. National Assembly Speaker Raimundo Pereira was appointed as an interim president until a nationwide election on 28 June 2009. It was won by Malam Bacai Sanhá of the PAIGC, against Kumba Ialá as the presidential candidate of the PRS.

On 9 January 2012, President Sanhá died of complications from diabetes, and Pereira was again appointed as an interim president. On the evening of 12 April 2012, members of the country's military staged a coup d'état and arrested the interim president and a leading presidential candidate. Former vice chief of staff, General Mamadu Ture Kuruma, assumed control of the country in the transitional period and started negotiations with opposition parties.

José Mário Vaz was the President of Guinea-Bissau from 2014 until 2019 presidential elections. At the end of his term, Vaz became the first elected president to complete his five-year mandate. He lost the 2019 election, however, to Umaro Sissoco Embaló, who took office in February 2020. Embaló is the first president to be elected without the backing of the PAIGC.

On 1 February 2022, there was an attempted coup d'état to overthrow President Umaro Sissoco Embaló. On 2 February 2022, state radio announced that four assailants and two members of the presidential guard had been killed in the incident. The African Union and ECOWAS both condemned the coup. Six days after the attempted coup d'état, on 7 February 2022, there was an attack on the building of Rádio Capital FM, a radio station critical of the Bissau-Guinean government; this was the second time the radio station suffered an attack of this nature in less than two years. A journalist working for the station recalled, while wishing to stay anonymous, that one of their colleagues had recognized one of the cars carrying the attackers as belonging to the presidency.

Politics

Guinea-Bissau is a republic. In the past, the government had been highly centralized. Multi-party governance was not established until mid-1991. The president is the head of state and the prime minister is the head of government. From independence in 1974, until Jose Mario Vaz ended his five-year term as president on 24 June 2019, no president successfully served a full five-year term.

At the legislative level, a unicameral Assembleia Nacional Popular (National People's Assembly) is made up of 100 members. They are popularly elected from multi-member constituencies to serve a four-year term. The judicial system is headed by a Tribunal Supremo da Justiça (Supreme Court), made up of nine justices appointed by the president; they serve at the pleasure of the president.

The two main political parties are the PAIGC (African Party for the Independence of Guinea and Cape Verde) and the PRS (Party for Social Renewal). There are more than 20 minor parties.

Foreign relations

Guinea-Bissau is a founding member state of the Community of Portuguese Language Countries (CPLP), also known as the Lusophone Commonwealth, and international organisation and political association of Lusophone nations across four continents, where Portuguese is an official language.

Military

A 2019 estimate put the size of the Guinea-Bissau Armed Forces at around 4,400 personnel and military spending is less than 2% of GDP .

In 2018, Guinea-Bissau signed the UN treaty on the Prohibition of Nuclear Weapons.

Administrative divisions

Guinea-Bissau is divided into eight regions and one autonomous sector. These, in turn, are subdivided into 37 Sectors. The regions are:

Geography

Guinea-Bissau is bordered by Senegal to the north and Guinea to the south and east, with the Atlantic Ocean to its west. It lies mostly between latitudes 11° and 13°N (a small area is south of 11°), and longitudes 11° and 15°W.

At , the country is larger in size than Taiwan or Belgium. 
Its terrain is mostly low coastal plains with swamps of the Guinean mangroves rising to the Guinean forest-savanna mosaic in the east. Its monsoon-like rainy season alternates with periods of hot, dry harmattan winds blowing from the Sahara. The Bijagos Archipelago lies off of the mainland. The country is home to two ecoregions: Guinean forest-savanna mosaic and Guinean mangroves.

Climate

Guinea-Bissau is warm all year round with mild temperature fluctuations; it averages . From December through April, the country experiences drought.

Environmental problems
Severe environmental problems include deforestation, soil erosion, overgrazing, and overfishing. Guinea-Bissau had a 2019 Forest Landscape Integrity Index mean score of 5.7/10, ranking it 97th globally out of 172 countries.

Wildlife

Economy

Guinea-Bissau's GDP per capita is one of the lowest in the world, and its Human Development Index is one of the lowest on earth. More than two-thirds of the population lives below the poverty line. The economy depends mainly on agriculture; fish, cashew nuts, and ground nuts are its major exports.

A long period of political instability has resulted in depressed economic activity, deteriorating social conditions, and increased macroeconomic imbalances. It takes longer on average to register a new business in Guinea-Bissau (233 days or about 33 weeks) than in any other country in the world except Suriname.

Guinea-Bissau has started to show some economic advances after a pact of stability was signed by the main political parties of the country, leading to an IMF-backed structural reform program.

After several years of economic downturn and political instability, in 1997, Guinea-Bissau entered the CFA franc monetary system, bringing about some internal monetary stability. The civil war that took place in 1998 and 1999, and a military coup in September 2003 again disrupted economic activity, leaving a substantial part of the economic and social infrastructure in ruins and intensifying the already widespread poverty. Following the parliamentary elections in March 2004 and presidential elections in July 2005, the country is trying to recover from the long period of instability, despite a still-fragile political situation.

Beginning around 2005, drug traffickers based in Latin America began to use Guinea-Bissau, along with several neighbouring West African nations, as a transshipment point to Europe for cocaine. The nation was described by a United Nations official as being at risk for becoming a "narco-state". The government and the military have done little to stop drug trafficking, which increased after the 2012 coup d'état.
The government of Guinea-Bissau continues to be ravaged by illegal drug distribution, according to The Week magazine.
Guinea-Bissau is a member of the Organisation for the Harmonisation of Business Law in Africa (OHADA).

Society

Demographics

The proportion of the population below the age of 15 in 2010 was 41.3%, 55.4% were aged between 15 and 65 years of age, while 3.3% were aged 65 years or older.

Ethnic groups

The population of Guinea-Bissau is ethnically diverse and has many distinct languages, customs, and social structures.

Bissau-Guineans can be divided into the following ethnic groups:
Fula and the Mandinka-speaking people, who constitute the largest portion of the population and are concentrated in the north and northeast;
Balanta and Papel people, who live in the southern coastal regions; and
Manjaco and Mancanha, who occupy the central and northern coastal areas.
Most of the remainder are mestiços of mixed Portuguese and African descent.

Portuguese natives are a very small percentage of Bissau-Guineans. After Guinea-Bissau gained independence, most of the Portuguese nationals left the country. The country has a tiny Chinese population. These include traders and merchants of mixed Portuguese and Cantonese ancestry from the former Asian Portuguese colony of Macau.

Major cities

Main cities in Guinea-Bissau include:

Languages

Though a small country, Guinea-Bissau has several ethnic groups which are very distinct from each other, with their own cultures and languages. This is due to Guinea-Bissau being a refugee and migration territory within Africa. Colonisation and racial intermixing brought Portuguese and the Portuguese creole known as Kriol or crioulo.

The sole official language of Guinea-Bissau since independence, Standard Portuguese is spoken mostly as a second language, with few native speakers and its use is often confined to the intellectual and political elites. It is the language of government and national communication as a legacy of colonial rule. Schooling from the primary to tertiary levels is conducted in Portuguese, although only 67% of children have access to any formal education. Data suggests that the number of Portuguese speakers ranges from 11 to 15%. In the latest census (2009) 27.1% of the population claimed to speak non-creole Portuguese (46.3% of city dwellers and 14.7% of the rural population, respectively). Portuguese creole is spoken by 44% of the population and is effectively the lingua franca among distinct groups for most of the population. Creole's usage is still expanding, and it is understood by the vast majority of the population. However, decreolisation processes are occurring, due to undergoing interference from Standard Portuguese and the creole forms a continuum of varieties with the standard language, the most distant are basilects and the closer ones, acrolects. A post-creole continuum exists in Guinea-Bissau and crioulo 'leve' ('soft' creole) variety being closer to the Portuguese-language norm.

The remaining rural population speaks a variety of native African languages unique to each ethnicity: Fula (16%), Balanta (14%), Mandinka (7%), Manjak (5%), Papel (3%), Felupe (1%), Beafada (0.7%), Bijagó (0.3%), and Nalu (0.1%), which form the ethnic African languages spoken by the population. Most Portuguese and Mestiços speakers also have one of the African languages and Kriol as additional languages. Ethnic African languages are not discouraged, in any situation, despite their lower prestige. These languages are the link between individuals of the same ethnic background and daily used in villages, between neighbours or friends, traditional and religious ceremonies, and also used in contact between the urban and rural populations. However, none of these languages are dominant in Guinea-Bissau.

French is taught as a foreign language in schools, because Guinea-Bissau is surrounded by French-speaking nations. Guinea-Bissau is a full member of the Francophonie.

Religion

Various studies suggest that slightly less than half of the population of Guinea-Bissau is Muslim, while substantial minorities follow folk religions or Christianity. The CIA World Factbook's 2020 estimate stated that the population was 46.1% Muslim, 30.6% following folk religions, 18.9% Christian, 4.4% other or unaffiliated. In 2010, a Pew Research survey determined that the population was 45.1% Muslim and 19.7% Christian, with 30.9% practicing folk religion and 4.3 other faiths. A 2015 Pew-Templeton study found that the population was 45.1% Muslim, 30.9% practicing folk religions, 19.7% Christian, and 4.3% unaffiliated. The ARDA projected in 2020 the share of the Muslim population to be 44.7%. It also estimated 41.2% of the population to be practitioners of ethnic religions and 13% to be Christians.
 

Concerning religious identity among Muslims, a Pew report determined that in Guinea-Bissau there is no prevailing sectarian identity. Guinea-Bissau shared this distinction with other Sub-Saharan countries like Tanzania, Uganda, Liberia, Nigeria and Cameroon. This Pew research also stated that countries in this specific study that declared to not have any clear dominant sectarian identity were mostly concentrated in Sub-Saharan Africa. Another Pew report, The Future of World Religions, predicts that from 2010 to 2050, practitioners of Islam will increase their share of the population in Guinea-Bissau.

Many residents practice syncretic forms of Islamic and Christian faiths, combining their practices with traditional African beliefs. Muslims dominate the north and east, while Christians dominate the south and coastal regions. The Roman Catholic Church claims most of the Christian community.

The 2021 US Department of State Report on International Religious Freedom mentions the fact that leaders of different religious communities believe that the existing communities are essentially tolerant, but express some concerns about rising religious fundamentalism in the country. An incident in July 2022, when a Catholic Church in the overwhelmingly Muslim region of Gabú was vandalised, raised concern amongst the Christian community that Islamic extremism might be infiltrating the country. However, there have been no further similar incidents, and no direct links to Islamic extremists have surfaced.

Health

Education

Education is compulsory from the age of 7 to 13. Pre-school education for children between three and six years of age is optional and in its early stages. There are five levels of education: pre-school, elemental and complementary basic education, general and complementary secondary education, general secondary education, technical and professional teaching, and higher education (university and non-universities). Basic education is under reform, and now forms a single cycle, comprising six years of education. Secondary education is widely available and there are two cycles (7th to 9th classe and 10th to 11th classe). Professional education in public institutions is nonoperational, however private school offerings opened, including the Centro de Formação São João Bosco (since 2004) and the Centro de Formação Luís Inácio Lula da Silva (since 2011).

Higher education is limited and most prefer to be educated abroad, with students preferring to enroll in Portugal. A number of universities, to which an institutionally autonomous Faculty of Law as well as a Faculty of Medicine that is maintained by Cuba and functions in different cities.

Child labor is very common. The enrollment of boys is higher than that of girls. In 1998, the gross primary enrollment rate was 53.5%, with higher enrollment ratio for males (67.7%) compared to females (40%).

Non-formal education is centered on community schools and the teaching of adults. In 2011, the literacy rate was estimated at 55.3% (68.9% male, and 42.1% female).

Conflicts
Usually, the many different ethnic groups in Guinea-Bissau coexist peacefully, but when conflicts do erupt, they tend to revolve around access to land.

Culture

Media

Music

The music of Guinea-Bissau is usually associated with the polyrhythmic gumbe genre, the country's primary musical export. However, civil unrest and other factors have combined over the years to keep gumbe, and other genres, out of mainstream audiences, even in generally syncretist African countries.

The cabasa is the primary musical instrument of Guinea-Bissau, and is used in extremely swift and rhythmically complex dance music. Lyrics are almost always in Guinea-Bissau Creole, a Portuguese-based creole language, and are often humorous and topical, revolving around current events and controversies.

The word gumbe is sometimes used generically, to refer to any music of the country, although it most specifically refers to a unique style that fuses about ten of the country's folk music traditions. Tina and tinga are other popular genres, while extent folk traditions include ceremonial music used in funerals, initiations, and other rituals, as well as Balanta brosca and kussundé, Mandinga djambadon, and the kundere sound of the Bissagos Islands.

Cuisine

Common dishes include soups and stews. Common ingredients include yams, sweet potato, cassava, onion, tomato, and plantain. Spices, peppers, and chilis are used in cooking, including Aframomum melegueta seeds (Guinea pepper).

Film
Flora Gomes is an internationally renowned film director; his most famous film is Nha Fala. Gomes's Mortu Nega (Death Denied) (1988) was the first fiction film and the second feature film ever made in Guinea-Bissau. (The first feature film was N’tturudu, by director  in 1987.) At FESPACO 1989, Mortu Nega won the prestigious Oumarou Ganda Prize. In 1992, Gomes directed Udju Azul di Yonta, which was screened in the Un Certain Regard section at the 1992 Cannes Film Festival. Gomes has also served on the boards of many Africa-centric film festivals. The actress Babetida Sadjo was born in Bafatá, Guinea-Bissau.

Sports
Football is the most popular sport in Guinea-Bissau. The Guinea-Bissau national football team is controlled by the Federação de Futebol da Guiné-Bissau. They are a member of the Confederation of African Football (CAF) and FIFA.

See also

Outline of Guinea-Bissau
Index of Guinea-Bissau-related articles

References

Further reading

Abdel Malek, K.,"Le processus d'accès à l'indépendance de la Guinée-Bissau", In : Bulletin de l'Association des Anciens Elèves de l'Institut National de Langues et de Cultures Orientales, N°1, Avril 1998. – pp. 53–60
Forrest, Joshua B., Lineages of State Fragility. Rural Civil Society in Guinea-Bissau (Ohio University Press/James Currey Ltd., 2003)
Galli, Rosemary E, Guinea Bissau: Politics, Economics and Society, (Pinter Pub Ltd., 1987)
Lobban Jr., Richard Andrew and Mendy, Peter Karibe, Historical Dictionary of the Republic of Guinea-Bissau, third edition (Scarecrow Press, 1997)
Vigh, Henrik, Navigating Terrains of War: Youth And Soldiering in Guinea-Bissau, (Berghahn Books, 2006)

External links

Link collection related to Guinea-Bissau on bolama.net 
Country Profile from BBC News
Guinea-Bissau. The World Factbook. Central Intelligence Agency.
Guinea-Bissau from UCB Libraries GovPubs
Guinea-Bissau at Encyclopædia Britannica

Key Development Forecasts for Guinea-Bissau from International Futures

Government

Constitution of the Republic of Guinea-Bissau
Guinea-Bissau: Prime Minister's fate unknown after apparent military coup – West Africa – Portuguese American Journal
Guinea-Bissau Holds First Post-Coup Election

Trade
Guinea-Bissau 2005 Summary Trade Statistics

News media
news headline links from AllAfrica.com

Tourism

Guinea-Bissau Turismo – RIOS AND LAGOONS

Health
The State of the World's Midwifery – Guinea-Bissau Country Profile

GIS information
Master Thesis about the developing Geographical Information for Guinea-Bissau

 
Economic Community of West African States
Former Portuguese colonies
Least developed countries
Member states of the Organisation internationale de la Francophonie
Member states of the African Union
Member states of the Community of Portuguese Language Countries
Member states of the Organisation of Islamic Cooperation
Member states of the United Nations
Portuguese-speaking countries and territories
Republics
States and territories established in 1974
West African countries
Small Island Developing States
1974 establishments in Guinea-Bissau
Countries in Africa